Secular is an adjective describing something separate from religion.

Secular may also refer to:

Aperiodic 
Secular basis, a long-term financial basis
Secular equilibrium, a situation in which the quantity of a radioactive isotope remains constant
 Secular Games, an ancient Roman religious celebration, involving sacrifices and theatrical performances, held for three days and nights to mark the end of a saeculum and the beginning of the next
Secular phenomena, astronomical phenomena that repeat too slowly to be observed, if at all
Secular stagnation, a theory of low economic growth
Secular variation, the long-term non-periodic variation of a time series

Separate from religion
 Mexican secularization act of 1833
Organized secularism
Secular clergy
Secular education
Secular humanism
Secular institute, a Catholic organization of individuals who are consecrated persons while living in the world

See also
Secularism
Secularization